The following is a list of George Mason Patriots men's basketball head coaches. There have been 11 head coaches of the Patriots in their 57-season history.

George Mason's current head coach is Kim English. He was hired as the Patriots' head coach in March 2021, replacing Dave Paulsen, who was fired after the 2020–21 season.

References

George Mason

George Mason Patriots men's basketball coaches